Norethisterone acetate oxime (developmental code names ORF-5263, So-36), or norethindrone acetate oxime, is a steroidal progestin of the 19-nortestosterone group which was developed as a postcoital contraceptive but was never marketed. It is the C3 oxime and C17β-acetate ester of norethisterone.

See also
 List of progestogens
 List of progestogen esters

References

Abandoned drugs
Acetate esters
Androgens and anabolic steroids
Estranes
Progestogen esters
Progestogens
Steroid oximes
Ketoximes